Osmond Watson (13 June 1934 – 15 November 2005) was a Jamaican painter and sculptor.

Biography
Born in Kingston, Jamaica, Watson attended art classes at the Institute of Jamaica's Junior Centre from 1948 until 1952; from that year until 1958 he attended the Jamaica School of Art and Crafts (JSAC) in Kingston. He began exhibiting, with some success, in his home country, but decided to go to London in 1961 for further study at St Martin's School of Art; there he remained until 1965, becoming acquainted as well with the collections of the British Museum.

His style changed somewhat after his return from England; his mature work was marked by the influence of African art, particularly of the Yoruba people, and cubism. Much of his subject matter was drawn from Jamaican society, including the Junkanoo festival and the Rastafari movement.

In 1992 he was awarded the Musgrave Gold Medal by the Institute of Jamaica for his work.

References

Veerle Poupeye, "Osmond Watson" (obituary), The Guardian, 1 December 2005.
Biography from the Art Encyclopedia at About.com
Veerle Poupeye. Caribbean Art. London; Thames and Hudson; 1998.
https://encrypted-tbn2.gstatic.com/images?q=tbn:ANd9GcTzXd7qOWOMjGp3X5BCb74AU1KFdK-HhiQmAfuDvU2yE3CqukxYXg

1934 births
2005 deaths
People from Kingston, Jamaica
Recipients of the Musgrave Medal
20th-century Jamaican sculptors
20th-century male artists
20th-century Jamaican painters